Foil Deer is the second studio album by Boston, Massachusetts indie rock band, Speedy Ortiz. The album was released by Carpark Records on April 21, 2015.

Critical reception
Foil Deer received generally favorable reviews from critics; on Metacritic, it has a score of 83 out of 100, indicating "universal acclaim."

Accolades

Track listing

References 

2015 albums
Speedy Ortiz albums
Carpark Records albums